Mike Seccombe is an Australian journalist. He is The Saturday Paper national correspondent, and appears regularly as a panelist on ABC TV.

Career

According to The Guardian Australia website, Seccombe covered national affairs and politics for The Sydney Morning Herald and from 2006-2011, he lived on Martha's Vineyard, Massachusetts writing for the Vineyard Gazette. He is now a national correspondent for The Saturday Paper. He is a regular panelist on the ABC Insiders program.

References

Australian political journalists
Living people
Year of birth missing (living people)